The State Secretariat for International Financial Matters (SIF; French: Secrétariat d'État aux questions financières internationales, German Staatssekretariat für internationale Finanzfragen, Italian Segreteria di Stato per le questioni finanziarie internazionali, Romansh Secretariat da stadi per dumondas finanzialas internaziunalas) is an administrative unit of the Swiss Confederation. It is an office of the federal administration of Switzerland under the responsibility of the Federal Department of Finance, and was established on 1 March 2010.

Objectives
The State Secretariat for International Financial Matters defends Switzerland's interests in international financial, tax and monetary matters. It promotes international competitiveness, the integrity of Switzerland's financial centre, access to foreign financial markets and the stability of the Swiss financial sector.

Role
The State Secretariat for International Financial Matters is responsible for the coordination and strategic management of international financial, monetary and tax matters. In order to pursue its objectives, SIF performs the following functions:
 Representation of Switzerland's interests in financial and tax matters vis-à-vis foreign countries.
 Safeguarding of Switzerland's interests in influential bodies such as the International Monetary Fund and the Financial Stability Board.
 Participation in international efforts to combat financial crime and terrorism.
 Analysis of financial market developments in Switzerland and abroad.
 Further development of financial sector legislation.

References

External links 
 Official website

Government of Switzerland